Nottinghamshire was a county constituency of the House of Commons of the Parliament of England then of the Parliament of Great Britain from 1707 to 1800 and of the Parliament of the United Kingdom from 1801 to 1832. It was represented by two Members of Parliament (MPs), traditionally known as Knights of the Shire.

The constituency was split into two two-member divisions, for Parliamentary purposes, by the Reform Act 1832. The county was then represented by the North Nottinghamshire and South Nottinghamshire constituencies.

Boundaries
The county of Nottinghamshire is located in the East Midlands of England. The county is known to have been represented in Parliament from 1290, although it probably sent knights of the shire to earlier meetings.

From 1295 the county and the town of Nottingham each returned two members to parliament. In 1572 East Retford was represented by two members, and in 1672 Newark-upon-Trent also. Under the Reform Act of 1832 the county returned four members in two divisions. By the act of 1885 it returned four members in four divisions; Newark and East Retford were disfranchised, and Nottingham returned three members in three divisions.

Members of Parliament

1290–1640
1305 Sir Hugh de Hercy and Thomas Malet

1316 Sir Hugh de Hercy and Lawrence Chaworth

1640–1832

Notes
The use of the term 'Non Partisan' in the list does not necessarily mean that the MP was not associated with a particular party or faction in Parliament. Stooks Smith only gives Nottinghamshire candidates party labels for the contested 1722 election and not again until well into the 19th century.

Election notes
The county franchise, from 1430, was held by the adult male owners of freehold land valued at 40 shillings or more. Each elector had as many votes as there were seats to be filled. Votes had to be cast by a spoken declaration, in public, at the hustings, which took place in Nottingham. The expense and difficulty of voting at only one location in the county, together with the lack of a secret ballot contributed to the corruption and intimidation of electors, which was widespread in the unreformed British political system.

The expense, to candidates and their supporters, of contested elections encouraged the leading families of the county to agree on the candidates to be returned unopposed whenever possible. Contested county elections were therefore unusual. Three families; the Duke of Newcastle, the Duke of Portland and the Pierreponts, all Whigs, dominated the county until well into the 19th century, which was why there was no contest after 1722.

The bloc vote electoral system was used in two seat elections and first past the post for single member by-elections. Each voter had up to as many votes as there were seats to be filled. Votes had to be cast by a spoken declaration, in public, at the hustings.

Note on percentage change calculations: Where there was only one candidate of a party in successive elections, for the same number of seats, change is calculated on the party percentage vote. Where there was more than one candidate, in one or both successive elections for the same number of seats, then change is calculated on the individual percentage vote.

Note on sources: The information for the election results given below is taken from Stooks Smith 1715–1754, Namier and Brooke 1754–1790 and Stooks Smith 1790–1832.

Election results 1715–1832

Elections in the 1710s

Elections in the 1720s

 Howe was a Peer of Ireland

Elections in the 1730s
 Seats vacated on Howe being appointed Governor of Barbados and Sutton being expelled from the House.

 Death of Bennet

Elections in the 1740s

 Sutton adopted the new surname of Manners-Sutton

Elections in the 1750s

 John Thornhagh adopted the new surname of Hewett

Elections in the 1760s

 Death of Manners-Sutton

Elections in the 1770s

 Succession of Willoughby as the 4th Baron Middleton

 Death of Lincoln

Elections in the 1780s

 Charles Medows adopted the surname of Pierrepont in 1788

Elections in the 1790s

 Note (1796): Stooks Smith incorrectly has Lord Edward Bentinck returned at this election rather than Lord William Bentinck

Elections in the 1800s
 Death of Pierrepont

 Resignation of Bentinck

 Pierrepont became known by the courtesy title of Viscount Newark, when his father was advanced in the peerage by being created Earl Manvers in 1806.

Elections in the 1810s

 Resignation of Bentinck

 Succession of Newark as 2nd Earl Manvers

 Frank adopted the new surname of Sotheron

Elections in the 1820s

Elections in the 1830s

 Constituency divided in (1832)

See also

List of former United Kingdom Parliament constituencies
Unreformed House of Commons

References
 British Parliamentary Election Results 1832–1885, compiled and edited by F.W.S. Craig (Macmillan Press 1977)
 The House of Commons 1754–1790, by Sir Lewis Namier and John Brooke (HMSO 1964)
 The Parliaments of England by Henry Stooks Smith (1st edition published in three volumes 1844–50), second edition edited (in one volume) by F.W.S. Craig (Political Reference Publications 1973)) out of copyright
Robert Beatson, A Chronological Register of Both Houses of Parliament (London: Longman, Hurst, Res & Orme, 1807) 
D Brunton & D H Pennington, Members of the Long Parliament (London: George Allen & Unwin, 1954)
Cobbett's Parliamentary history of England, from the Norman Conquest in 1066 to the year 1803 (London: Thomas Hansard, 1808) 
 J E Neale, The Elizabethan House of Commons (London: Jonathan Cape, 1949)
 

Parliamentary constituencies in Nottinghamshire (historic)
Constituencies of the Parliament of the United Kingdom established in 1290
Constituencies of the Parliament of the United Kingdom disestablished in 1832